In Roman Dacia, an estimated 50,000 troops were stationed at its height.

At the close of Trajan’s first campaign in Dacia in 102, he stationed one legion at Sarmizegetusa Regia. With the conclusion of Trajan’s conquest of Dacia, he stationed at least two legions in the new province – the Legio IV Flavia Felix positioned at Berzobis, and the Legio XIII Gemina stationed at Apulum. It has been conjectured that there was a third legion stationed in Dacia at the same time, the Legio I Adiutrix. However, there is no evidence to indicate when or where it was stationed. Debate continues over whether the legion was fully present, or whether it was only the vexillationes who were stationed in the province.

Hadrian, the subsequent emperor, shifted the fourth legion (Legio IV Flavia Felix) from Berzobis to Singidunum in Moesia Superior, suggesting that Hadrian believed the presence of one legion in Dacia would be sufficient to ensure the security of the province. The Marcomannic Wars that erupted north of the Danube forced Marcus Aurelius to reverse this policy, permanently transferring the Legio V Macedonica from Troesmis (modern Iglița in Romania) in Moesia Inferior to Potaissa in Dacia.

Epigraphic evidence attests to large numbers of auxiliary units stationed throughout the Dacian provinces during the Roman period; this has given the impression that Roman Dacia was a strongly militarized province. Yet it seems to have been no more highly militarized than any of the other frontier provinces, like the Moesias, the Pannonias, and Syria, and the number of legions stationed in Moesia and Pannonia were not diminished after the creation of Dacia. However, once Dacia was incorporated into the empire and the frontier was extended northward, the central portion of the Danube frontier between Novae and Durostorum was able to release much-needed troops to bolster Dacia’s defences. Military documents report at least 58 auxiliary units, most transferred into Dacia from the flanking Moesian and Pannonian provinces, with a wide variety of forms and functions, including numeri, cohortes milliariae, quingenariae, and alae. This does not imply that all were positioned in Dacia at the same time, nor that they were in place throughout the existence of Roman Dacia.

Legions

Cohorts

Alae

Numeri

See also
Roman Dacia
Imperial Roman army
List of Roman auxiliary regiments

References

Military of ancient Rome
Roman Dacia